Blaca may refer to:

 Blaca, Serbia, a hamlet near Tutin, Serbia
 Blaca, Croatia, a hamlet near Solin, Croatia
 Blaca hermitage, a hermitage on Brač island, Split-Dalmatia County, Croatia